Trkal is a rural locality (a selo) in Ashaga-Arkhitsky Selsoviet, Khivsky District, Republic of Dagestan, Russia. The population was 27 as of 2010. There are 10 streets.

Geography 
Trkal is located 12 km southeast of Khiv (the district's administrative centre) by road. Tslak is the nearest rural locality.

References 

Rural localities in Khivsky District